Local Color is a  compact disc by the University of Northern Iowa Jazz Band One produced in the recording studio at Russell Hall in the University of Northern Iowa School of Music.  This is their 25th CD release in as many years.  This group has been consistently recognized as one of the top collegiate jazz ensembles in the United States having won numerous Down Beat awards and accolades from music industry professionals.   "..(the professors) have a magical way with these kids.   Each time I hear one of (the) groups, I'm even more blown way than the last time."

Background 
The University of Northern Iowa Jazz Band One has a long tradition of award winning recordings with the "Local Color" CD being the 25th release in as many years.   Jazz Band One was the winner of 1999 Down Beat Magazine Student Music Performance Award and also recognized in the International Association for Jazz Education Journal with Dr. Herb Wong's International Association for Jazz Education Blue Chip Jazz Award.  In January 2000, Down Beat Magazine featured an article entitled, "The Best Jazz CDs of the 90's."  In the article, all CDs that received 5- and 4 1/2-star reviews in the 1990s were listed; UNI Jazz Band One was the only university big band to receive two 5-star reviews that year.   The group has toured Europe and Asia several times playing at the North Sea Jazz Festival  and Montreux Jazz Festival's.  A great deal of student and alumni composition rounds out the selections of the CD, Amur In Her Heart was a special commission presented to the group which features guest artists Michael Conrad (organ), Justin Kisor (trumpet), and Mitra Sadeghpour (vocalise).

Track listing 
Track Listing:

Recording Sessions 
 May/June, 2015 at the Russell Hall recording studio, University of Northern Iowa, Cedar Falls, IA

Musicians 
Director: Christopher Merz
Saxophones/Woodwinds: Ryan Middleton, Sam Bills, Sean Koga, Mark Northrup, Mason Meyers
Trumpets: Dan Meier, Andrew Teutsch, Ryan Garmoe, Jordan Boehm, Michael Prichard
Trombones: Brian Crew, Paul Lichty, Brent Mead, Thomas Rauch
Rhythm section: Seth Butler, acoustic and electric piano; Elvis Phillips, guitar; Riley Scheetz, acoustic and electric bass; Chris Jensen, drums; Patrick Cunningham, vibraphone and percussion
Guest soloists: Michael Conrad, organ; Justin Kisor, trumpet; Mitra Sadeghpour, voice (all on Amur in Her Heart)

Production 

 Producer and mixing: Christopher Merz
 Recording engineer, mixing, and mastering: Tom Barry
 Cover art, layout and design: Zac Lane

Works from the compact disc 

The works from the compact disc are wide ranging and reflect the eclectic and innovative teaching that Chris Merz and the UNI Music School professors promote.  Other faculty and internationally acclaimed artists are collaborated with on the CD (to include vocalize sung by Dr. Mitra Sadeghpour).    All the selections  point to the well rooted traditions of jazz taught in the curriculum at the UNI School of Music.   Numerous student works are featured on the recording also.

Critical reception and professional ratings 

"The band as a whole is exemplary, and director Chris Merz deserves three cheers for having his young charges primed and ready to face the erraticisms of the recording studio. In sum, Local Color proves a worthy addition to UNI's expanding catalog of admirable recordings."

Jack Bowers, senior contributor, All About Jazz

References

External links

UNI Jazz Studies - University of Northern Iowa

 

2015 albums
Jazz albums by American artists